Xin Los Angeles (also known as XLA) is a container ship owned and operated by China Shipping Container Lines. She was the largest in the world at the time of her completion in 2006, but since been overtaken in size by several vessels, some with more than double her capacity. Xin Los Angeles has a capacity of 9,600 TEU and is one of a class of six. She is registered in Hong Kong.

Design 
Xin Los Angeles was launched in 2004 in the ship-yard of Samsung Heavy Industries and was completed in 2006. She has a deadweight tonnage of 107,200 metric tons, is 336.7 meters long and has a beam of 45.6 meters and a draft of 14.3 meters, when fully loaded. The design of the hull allows for decreased water resistance and the hull paint prevents the growth of duckweed and molluscs.

Engine 
Xin Los Angeles  main engines are MAN B&W 12K98MC-C Mk6. During sea trials the ship achieved a ballast service speed of 25.4 knots. At full power the engines provide 68,520 kW  and a cruising speed when fully loaded of 23.4 knots.

References

External links

Xin Los Angeles Position

Container ships
Merchant ships of Panama
2006 ships
Ships built by Samsung Heavy Industries